Jorge Doroteo Zapata García (born 26 September 1949) is a Mexican lawyer and politician affiliated with the Institutional Revolutionary Party. As of 2014 he served as Senator of the LVIII and LIX Legislatures of the Mexican Congress representing Chihuahua and as the LIII and LVII Legislatures.

References

1949 births
Living people
People from Chihuahua City
Members of the Senate of the Republic (Mexico)
Members of the Chamber of Deputies (Mexico)
Institutional Revolutionary Party politicians
20th-century Mexican lawyers
21st-century Mexican politicians